Bruce Fraser (born 1946), is a British former hammer thrower who competed for England.

Athletics career
He represented England and won a silver medal in the hammer throw, at the 1970 British Commonwealth Games in Edinburgh, Scotland.

References

1946 births
English male hammer throwers
Commonwealth Games medallists in athletics
Commonwealth Games silver medallists for England
Athletes (track and field) at the 1970 British Commonwealth Games
Living people
Medallists at the 1970 British Commonwealth Games